Bilanga is a town in the Bilanga Department of Gnagna Province in eastern Burkina Faso. The town has a population of 3,470 and is the capital of Bilanga Department.

References

External links
Satellite map at Maplandia.com

Populated places in the Est Region (Burkina Faso)
Gnagna Province